Three justices of the seven-member North Carolina Supreme Court and five judges of the 15-member North Carolina Court of Appeals were elected by North Carolina voters on November 3, 2020, concurrently with other state elections. Terms for seats on each court are eight years. These elections were conducted on a partisan basis.

Incumbent Court of Appeals Judges Linda McGee and Wanda Bryant (both Democrats) did not reopen their campaign accounts with the State Board of Elections, indicating they would not run for re-election, and they did not file for re-election by the time filing closed on Dec. 20, 2019.

Only one candidate from each party filed for each seat, meaning that no party primary elections would be necessary.

In the general election, Republican candidates won all of the races. The results of the Chief Justice race were only confirmed after a lengthy recount process, because of the narrow margin.

Supreme Court

Chief Justice (Beasley seat)
Chief Justice Mark Martin, a Republican, announced his resignation in 2019, triggering an election for his seat in 2020. Governor Roy Cooper appointed Associate Justice Cheri Beasley, a Democrat, to become Chief Justice through 2020.

Candidates

Declared
Cheri Beasley (Democratic), incumbent Chief Justice
Paul Martin Newby (Republican), incumbent Associate Justice

Polling

with Generic Democrat and Generic Republican

Results

Beasley requested a recount on Nov. 17, 2020. After the recount found the margin between the candidates to be 401 votes, Beasley called for a second recount in a sampling of precincts statewide, as allowed by law. Beasley then conceded the election to Newby on Dec. 12.

Seat 2 (Newby seat)
The seat then held by Associate Justice Paul Martin Newby was up for election in 2020. Newby announced that he would run for Chief Justice instead, leaving his Associate Justice seat open.

Candidates

Declared
Phil Berger Jr. (Republican), incumbent judge of the North Carolina Court of Appeals 
Lucy Inman (Democratic), incumbent judge of the North Carolina Court of Appeals

Polling

Results

Seat 4 (Davis seat)
Beasley's elevation to the position of Chief Justice made her Associate Justice seat vacant, which also triggered a 2020 election. Governor Cooper appointed Court of Appeals Judge Mark A. Davis to fill the vacancy as an associate justice.

Candidates

Declared
Tamara P. Barringer (Republican), former state senator (2012–2019)
Mark A. Davis (Democratic), incumbent Associate Justice

Polling

Results

Court of Appeals

Seat 4

Candidates
Declared
Tricia Shields (Democrat), attorney and Campbell University Law School instructor
April C. Wood (Republican), North Carolina District Court Judge

Results

Seat 5

Candidates
Declared
Lora Christine Cubbage (Democrat), North Carolina Superior Court Judge
Fred Gore (Republican), North Carolina District Court Judge

Results

Seat 6

Candidates
Declared
Chris Dillon (Republican), incumbent Court of Appeals Judge
Gray Styers (Democrat), attorney

Results

Seat 7
Judge Reuben Young, a Democrat, was appointed by Gov. Roy Cooper to fill a vacancy, through the end of 2020, and was eligible to run for a full term.

Candidates
Declared
Jeff Carpenter (Republican), North Carolina Superior Court Judge
Reuben Young (Democrat), incumbent Court of Appeals Judge

Results

Seat 13
Judge Christopher Brook, a Democrat, was appointed by Gov. Roy Cooper to fill a vacancy, through the end of 2020, and was eligible to run for a full term.

Candidates
Declared
Christopher Brook (Democrat), incumbent Court of Appeals Judge. 
Jefferson G. Griffin (Republican), North Carolina District Court Judge

Results

Notes

References

judicial
2020